Phosphatidylinositol-glycan-specific phospholipase D is an enzyme that in humans is encoded by the GPLD1 gene.

Many proteins are tethered to the extracellular face of eukaryotic plasma membranes by a glycosylphosphatidylinositol (GPI) anchor. The GPI-anchor is a glycolipid found on many blood cells. The protein encoded by the GPLD1 gene is a GPI degrading enzyme that hydrolyzes the inositol phosphate linkage in proteins anchored by phosphatidylinositol glycans, thereby releasing the attached protein from the plasma membrane.

Plasma concentrations of Gpld1 in mice were found to increase after exercise and to correlate with improved cognitive function, and concentrations of GPLD1 in blood were increased in active elderly humans.

Interactions 

GPLD1 has been shown to interact with Apolipoprotein A1 and APOA4.

References

Further reading